Coscinocephalus is a genus of rhinoceros beetles in the family Scarabaeidae. There are at least two described species in Coscinocephalus.

Species
These two species belong to the genus Coscinocephalus:
 Coscinocephalus cribrifrons (Schaeffer, 1906)
 Coscinocephalus tepehuanus Morón & Ratcliffe, 1996

References

Further reading

 
 
 
 

Dynastinae
Articles created by Qbugbot